The RN-3 National Highway is a short national highway of Djibouti.

Roads in Djibouti